Maskanwa is a town and railway station located in the Gonda district of Uttar Pradesh, India.

Transport
Maskanwa railway station is situated on Lucknow–Gorakhpur line under the Lucknow NER railway division of North Eastern Railway zone.

Languages
The official language is Hindi and the additional official language is Urdu. The majority of the population speak Awadhi.

Demographics
 As per provisional reports of Census India, the population of Maskanwa in 2011 was 1,508; of which 776 were males and 732 were females.

References

 http://www.censusindia.gov.in/2011-prov-results/paper2/data_files/india/paper2_4.pdf

External links
2001 maps; provides maps of social, economic and demographic data of India in 2001

Villages in Gonda district